Diodia (or buttonweed) is a genus of flowering plants in the family Rubiaceae. It was described by Carl Linnaeus in 1753. The genus is found from southern and eastern United States, South America, Central America, Mexico, the West Indies and tropical Africa.

Other buttonweeds
Many species of Diodia have been transferred to a closely related genus Diodella, and therefore the name buttonweed also applies to these species. There are also many species of false buttonweeds in the related genus Spermacoce. Abutilon theophrasti in the family Malvaceae is also known by the common name of buttonweed.

Species
 Diodia aulacosperma K.Schum. - Socotra, Somalia, Kenya, Tanzania 
 Diodia barbata (Poir.) DC. - Guyana, Dominican Republic
 Diodia barbigera Hook. & Arn. - Mexico
 Diodia discolor DC. - French Guiana
 Diodia domingensis DC. - Dominican Republic
 Diodia flavescens Hiern - Angola, Zambia
 Diodia incana Aresch. - Ecuador
 Diodia kuntzei K.Schum. - Venezuela, Bolivia, Peru, Brazil, Argentina, Paraguay 
 Diodia macrophylla K.Schum. - Brazil, Paraguay
 Diodia microcarpa K.Schum. - Brazil 
 Diodia mitens Bello - Puerto Rico
 Diodia othonii Rizzini - Brazil 
 Diodia paludosa Kuntze - Paraguay
 Diodia perforata Urb. - Haiti
 Diodia rubricosa Hiern - Ghana, Ivory Coast, Liberia, Nigeria, Sierra Leone  
 Diodia saponariifolia (Cham.  & Schltdl.) K.Schum.
 Diodia saponarioides C.Presl - Mexico, Brazil, Argentina, Paraguay
 Diodia simplex Sw. - Cuba, Jamaica
 Diodia spicata Miq. - Panama, Colombia, Venezuela, Guyana, French Guinea, Brazil 
 Diodia vaginalis Benth. - Benin, Ghana, Ivory Coast, Liberia, Nigeria, Sierra Leone, Togo, Cameroon, Gabon, Congo-Brazzaville 
 Diodia verticillata Vahl - Brazil, Lesser Antilles 
 Diodia virginiana L. - Virginia buttonweed - south-central and south-eastern United States from Texas to Kansas, east to Florida and New Jersey; also Connecticut, Cuba and Nicaragua. Naturalized in Japan, Taiwan and northern California

References

External links
Diodia in the World Checklist of Rubiaceae
Jepson Manual Treatment
USDA Plants Profile

Rubiaceae genera
Spermacoceae
Taxa named by Carl Linnaeus